Madathara is a village located in the Chithara Panchayath of Kollam district. Thiruvananthapuram tenkasi road is passed through this village.It's a border village of Thiruvananthapuram and Kollam districts. Madathara Junction is a small town and major portions are forest area. Madatharakani government high school is important educational institution.

Kollam district
Kerala